Charles Henry Leicester Stanhope, 12th Earl of Harrington (born 20 July 1945), styled as Viscount Petersham from birth until his father's death in 2009, is the son of William Stanhope, 11th Earl of Harrington, and his wife, Eileen Grey.

Early life
Charles Henry Leicester Stanhope was born 20 July 1945 to William Stanhope, 11th Earl of Harrington (1922–2009), and Eileen Grey, daughter of Sir John Foley Grey, 8th Baronet. He had two older sisters, the elder of whom was Lady Jane Stanhope (1942–1974), who married Anthony Cameron and was killed in a motor accident in 1974. His second sister is Lady Avena Margaret Clare Stanhope (b. 1944), who married Adrian Maxwell.

Wealth
He was ranked 325th in the Sunday Times Rich List 2008 with an estimated wealth of £250 million. He is the owner of some prime land in London. Though the net assets of his two main companies, Elvaston Investments and Stanhope Gardens, came in at about £5 million in 2005, his total land holdings have been valued recently at about £250 million.

Personal life
He married, firstly, Virginia Freeman-Jackson (b.1939), the daughter of Harry Freeman-Jackson on 14 September 1966, and they were divorced in 1983. They had two children and four grandchildren:
William Stanhope, Viscount Petersham (born 14 October 1967), who married Candida Bond on 28 April 2001. They have two children: 
The Honourable Tirkana Stanhope (1 August 2003) 
The Honourable Augustus Stanhope (26 September 2005), Elizabeth II's second page of honour from 2015 to 2019
Serena Armstrong-Jones, Countess of Snowdon  (born 1 March 1970), who married David Armstrong-Jones, Viscount Linley (later the 2nd Earl of Snowdon) on 8 October 1993. They have two children:
Charles Armstrong-Jones, Viscount Linley (1 July 1999)
Lady Margarita Armstrong-Jones (14 May 2002)

He married, secondly, the photographer Anita Fuglesang, formerly the wife of Michael Howard, 21st Earl of Suffolk.

References

Burke's Peerage

1945 births
Living people
12
Charles